Donjeta Haxha (born 14 May 1996) is a Kosovan footballer who plays as a defender. She has been a member of the Kosovo women's national team.

Club career
Haxha has played for KFF Mitrovica and KFF Hajvalia.

International career
Haxha is of Albanian descent. In 2014, she represented Albania at the 2015 UEFA Women's Under-19 Championship qualification. In March 2017, she played for Kosovo at the Turkish Women's Cup.

See also
List of Kosovo women's international footballers

References

1996 births
Living people
Sportspeople from Mitrovica, Kosovo
Kosovan women's footballers
Women's association football defenders
KFF Hajvalia players
Kosovo women's international footballers
Kosovan people of Albanian descent
Sportspeople of Albanian descent
Albanian women's footballers